Inden is a municipality in the district of Düren in the state of North Rhine-Westphalia, Germany. It is located on the river Inde, approx. 10 km north-west of Düren. In the area around Inden lignite is extracted in open-pit mines. One mine is being rehabilitated with lake, park, solar power and energy storage. Several hundreds of inhabitants have been resettled in the 1990s and 2000s because of these activities.

Town division 
Districts:
Frenz
Inden/Altdorf
Lamersdorf
Lucherberg
Schophoven
Viehöven

References

External links

Düren (district)